Mother of God Cathedral also called Our Lady of Chaldeans is a Chaldean Catholic cathedral located in Southfield, Michigan, United States.  It is the seat for the Eparchy of St. Thomas the Apostle of Detroit.

History
The first Chaldean and Assyrian people to immigrate to the United States arrived at the end of nineteenth century.  Although small in number they were spread across the country by the middle of the twentieth century.  Mother of God Church was established in Southfield in 1948.  The present church building was completed in 1980 in the Byzantine Revival style.  It became a cathedral when the Eparchy of St. Thomas the Apostle of Detroit was established in 1982.

See also
List of Catholic cathedrals in the United States
List of cathedrals in the United States

References

External links
 Official Cathedral Site

Christian organizations established in 1948
Churches completed in 1980
Assyrian-American culture in Michigan
Eastern Catholic churches in Michigan
Chaldean Catholic cathedrals in the United States
Churches in Oakland County, Michigan
Southfield, Michigan
Byzantine Revival architecture in Michigan
1948 establishments in Michigan
Catholic cathedrals in Michigan